Micadina is a genus of stick insects in the tribe Necrosciini, erected by Josef Redtenbacher in 1908.  Species have been recorded from temperate and subtropical Asia, including China, Japan, Korea and Vietnam.

Species
The Phasmida Species File lists:
 Micadina bilobata Liu & Cai, 1994
 Micadina brachyptera Liu & Cai, 1994
 Micadina brevioperculina Bi, 1992
 Micadina cheni Ho, 2012
 Micadina conifera Chen & He, 1997
 Micadina difficilis Günther, 1940
 Micadina fujianensis Liu & Cai, 1994
 Micadina involuta Günther, 1940
 Micadina phluctainoides (Rehn, 1904) - type species (as Marmessoidea  phluctainoides JAG Rehn)
 Micadina reni Ho, 2013
 Micadina sonani Shiraki, 1935
 Micadina songxiaobini Ho, 2017
 Micadina vietnamensis Ho, 2018
 Micadina yasumatsui Shiraki, 1935
 Micadina yingdensis Chen & He, 1992
 Micadina zhejiangensis Chen & He, 1995

References

External links

Phasmatodea genera
Phasmatodea of Asia
Lonchodidae